The 1978 Tour du Haut Var was the tenth edition of the Tour du Haut Var cycle race and was held on 26 February 1978. The race started in Nice and finished in Seillans. The race was won by Freddy Maertens.

General classification

References

1978
1978 in road cycling
1978 in French sport